Robert Parker Parrott (October 5, 1804 – December 24, 1877) was an American soldier and inventor of military ordnance.

Born in Lee, New Hampshire, he was the son of John Fabyan Parrott. He graduated with honors from the United States Military Academy, third of the Class of 1824.  Parrott was assigned to the 3rd U.S. Artillery as a second lieutenant. He remained at West Point as an instructor until 1829, then had garrison duty and served as a staff officer in operations against the Creek Indians early in 1836 before moving to Washington, D.C., in July as Captain of Ordnance. He resigned from the army four months later to become the superintendent the West Point Iron and Cannon Foundry in Cold Spring, New York, with which he would be associated for the remainder of his life. In 1839 he married Mary Kemble, sister of Gouverneur Kemble, founder of the ironworks.

While employed at West Point, he and his brother Peter Parrott also assumed management of the operation of the Kemble-owned furnaces in Orange County, New York. The brothers purchased a ⅓ interest in Greenwood Furnace from a minority holder in 1837, and bought it entirely from the Kembles in 1839.

In 1860 he produced the Parrott rifle, an innovative rifled cannon which was manufactured in several sizes. The largest weighed 26,000 lb (11,800 kg) and fired a projectile that weighed 300 lb (140 kg). Parrott guns were extensively employed during the American Civil War by both the Union and Confederate armies.

In 1867 Parrott ended his superintendency of the West Point Foundry to concentrate on the ironworks in Orange County. However, he continued to experiment with artillery shells and fuses at West Point until his death at Cold Spring at the age of 73.

References

External links
 Putnam County Recorder article on Parrott
 Civil War Artillery: Biography of Parrott
 Greenwood Furnace
 

United States Military Academy alumni
United States Army officers
19th-century American inventors
1804 births
1877 deaths
Foundrymen
American Civil War industrialists
People of New York (state) in the American Civil War
People from Lee, New Hampshire